Jehay Castle or Jehay-Bodegnée Castle ( or Jehay-Bodegnée) is a castle situated in the municipality of Amay in Liège Province, Wallonia, Belgium.

History

Most of the structure of the current château dates from the beginning of the 16th century. Of its medieval predecessor there remain only some vaulted basements of the former keep, dating from the 13th century. In the 19th century the castle was extensively renovated and extended by the famous architect Alphonse Balat in a sober Gothic Revival style.
The beautifully decorated interior houses a collection of antique furniture, musical instruments, tapestry, paintings and other art objects.

Since the end of the 17th century the castle has been the property of the Counts van den Steen de Jehay. After the death of the last Count van den Steen in 1999, the castle and its collections were acquired by Liège Province.

The domain is open to visitors every day except Mondays, between April and October. The interior of the castle is closed for restoration (situation 2015).

See also
List of castles in Belgium
 List of protected heritage sites in Amay

External links 

  
 Castle of Jehay-Bodegnée on Advisor.Travel

Castles in Belgium
Castles in Liège Province
Wallonia's Major Heritage
Museums in Liège Province
Historic house museums in Belgium
Amay